Black Rock Yacht Club is a Yacht club for off-the-beach sailing boats (mostly dinghies) on the shores of Port Phillip Bay, seventeen kilometres south of Melbourne, Australia. The club was founded in 1904 and has a proud history of Olympic, world and Australian champions. Classes sailed include International 14, Sabre, 125, 420, Moth, Sabot, Optimist, Minnow, and Australian Lightweight Sharpie.

In 1926 the nineteenth century warship HMVS Cerberus was scuttled to form a breakwater in front of the club and as a result launching is quite easy in most wind conditions.

Black Rock Yacht Club hosted the Moth World Championships (2004–05 ) and the 470 Worlds in 1999. Twice hosting the Finn Gold Cup (world champs) The fleet of International 14s sailing out of Black Rock is particularly strong and 2005 World Champion Lindsay Irwin is a BRYC member.

External links
Black Rock Yacht Club

Yacht clubs in Victoria (Australia)
Sporting clubs in Melbourne
1904 establishments in Australia
Sports clubs established in 1904
Sport in the City of Bayside
Buildings and structures in the City of Bayside